Drycothaea jolyi is a species of beetle in the family Cerambycidae. It was described by Galileo and Martins in 2010. It is known from Peru.

References

Calliini
Beetles described in 2010